The Nativity of Holy Theotokos Church is a historic Russian Orthodox church in Afognak, Alaska.  The present church is the third Russian Orthodox church built in Afognak, and replaced the second which had been built in the late 1800s.  Its construction began in 1901, and was completed in 1905.  The community was mostly "washed out" by a 1964 tsunami, and moved to Port Lions, but the church building remained.

In 1979, it was believed that the community would return and that the church would be used again, although it would be necessary to move the church further away from the water's edge.

The church was added to the National Register of Historic Places in 1980.

See also
National Register of Historic Places listings in Kodiak Island Borough, Alaska

References

Churches completed in 1905
Russian Orthodox church buildings in Alaska
Churches on the National Register of Historic Places in Alaska
Buildings and structures in Kodiak Island Borough, Alaska
Buildings and structures on the National Register of Historic Places in Kodiak Island Borough, Alaska